Princess Pingyang (formally Princess Zhao of Pingyang (590s – March 623) was a Chinese princess and general. 

She was the only daughter of Li Yuan (later enthroned as Emperor Gaozu), the founding emperor of the Tang dynasty, and his wife Empress Taimu. She helped him to seize power and eventually take over the throne from Sui dynasty by organizing an "Army of the Lady", commanded by herself, in her campaign to capture the Sui capital Chang'an. 
She was the first woman general of the Tang dynasty.

Background 
The future Princess Pingyang was the third daughter of Li Yuan, Duke of Tang, a hereditary nobleman of Sui China. She was his third daughter, but the only daughter of his wife Duchess Dou, who also bore four sons -- Li Jiancheng, Li Shimin (later Emperor Taizong), Li Xuanba, and Li Yuanji. Eventually, Li Yuan gave her in marriage to Chai Shao, the son of Chai Shen (柴慎) the Duke of Julu.

She is not to be confused from another Princess Pingyang in the Western Han dynasty.

Participation in Tang's founding 
In 617, Li Yuan, then the general in charge at Taiyuan was planning to rebel against Emperor Yang of Sui, by whom he had been imprisoned before. He sent messengers to his daughter and son-in-law Chai Shao, then at the Sui capital Chang'an, summoning them back to Taiyuan. Chai worried that they would not be able to escape together easily, and when he consulted her, she told him to go and that she, as a woman, would be able to hide more easily. He therefore secretly headed for Taiyuan and, after first meeting Li Jiancheng and Li Yuanji, whom Li Yuan had similarly recalled from Hedong (now part of Yuncheng, Shanxi), reported to Taiyuan.

Pingyang hid initially, but then distributed her wealth to several hundred men, receiving their loyalty, so she rose in support of Li Yuan. She sent her servant Ma Sanbao (馬三寶) to persuade the agrarian rebel leader He Panren (何潘仁) to join her, and then also persuaded other rebel leaders Li Zhongwen (李仲文), Xiang Shanzhi (向善志), and Qiu Shili (丘師利) to join her as well. She attacked and captured some of the nearby cities, and she gathered a total of 70,000 men.

Late in 617, Li Yuan crossed the Yellow River into the Chang'an region, and he sent Chai Shao to rendezvous with her. They then joined Li Shimin, commanding one wing of Li Yuan's army.  Chai and she set up separate headquarters as commanding generals, and her army became known as the "Army of the Lady."  In June 618, Li Yuan had Emperor Yang's grandson Yang You yield the throne to him, establishing the Tang dynasty as Emperor Gaozu. He created her the Princess Pingyang, and as she contributed greatly to his victory, he particularly honored her over his 18 other daughters.

Death 
The Princess Pingyang, however, was not recorded as having been involved in another battle after her father's capture of Chang'an; she later died in March 623. At her funeral on 18 March 623, Emperor Gaozu ordered that a grand military funeral, fit for a high general, be given for her.  When officials of the Ministry of Rites objected to the presence of a band, stating that women's funerals were not supposed to have bands, he responded, "As you know, the princess mustered an army that helped us overthrow the Sui dynasty. She participated in many battles, and her help was decisive in founding the Tang dynasty. ... She was no ordinary woman."

Issue 
Princess Pingyang and her husband, Chai Shao, had two sons:

Chai Zhewei 柴哲威, titled Duke of Qiao
Chai Lingwu 柴令武 (died 653), titled Duke of Xiangyang, married Emperor Taizong's daughter Princess Baling (巴陵公主)

Ancestry

Notes

References 
 
 Old Book of Tang, vol. 58 .
 New Book of Tang, vol. 83 .
 Zizhi Tongjian, vols. 183, 184, 190.

Year of birth uncertain
623 deaths
Tang dynasty princesses
Tang dynasty generals
Women in war in China
Women in medieval warfare
7th-century Chinese women
7th-century Chinese people
Chinese female generals
Daughters of emperors